The 2011 BWF World Junior Championships is the thirteenth tournament of the BWF World Junior Championships. This tournament was held in Taoyuan, Taiwan at Taoyuan Arena from October 28 to November 6, 2011.

Host city
In June 2009, the Chinese Taipei Badminton Association successfully bid for this event. This is also the first time for the Republic of China (Taiwan) officially won the bid to host the badminton World Championships tournament.

Medalists

Team competition
A total of 22 countries competed at the team competition in 2011 BWF World Junior Championships.

Final positions

Final round

Individual competitions

Boys Singles

Seeded

  Viktor Axelsen (final)
  Zulfadli Zulkiffli (champion)
  Kento Momota (semifinals)
  Sameer Verma (semifinals)
  Emre Lale (third round)
  Pratul Joshi (second round)
  Srikanth Kidambi (fourth round)
  Ng Ka Long (quarter-finals)
  Arif Gifar Ramadhan (fourth round)
  Shesar Hiren Rhustavito (quarter-finals)
  Soong Joo Ven (third round)
  Kim Bruun (third round)
  Lucas Corvée (third round)
  Kai Schäfer (fourth round)
  Anatoliy Yartsev (third round)
  Tam Chun Hei (fourth round)

Finals

Top half

Section 1

Section 2

Section 3

Section 4

Bottom half

Section 5

Section 6

Section 7

Section 8

Girls Singles

Seeded

  Ratchanok Intanon (champion)
  Carolina Marín (semifinals)
  Nozomi Okuhara (semifinals)
  P. V. Sindhu (third round)
  Elyzabeth Purwaningtyas (final)
  Romina Gabdullina (quarter-finals)
  Neslihan Yiğit (fourth round)
  Soniia Cheah (quarter-finals)
  Cheung Ngan Yi (fourth round)
  Lê Thu Huyền (third round)
  Lee So-hee (third round)
  Liang Xiaoyu (second round)
  Cemre Fere (fourth round)
  Airi Mikkelä (third round)
  Mette Poulsen (third round)
  Ebru Tunalı (second round)

Finals

Top half

Section 1

Section 2

Section 3

Section 4

Bottom half

Section 5

Section 6

Section 7

Section 8

Boys Doubles

Seeded

  Huang Po-jui / Lin Chia-yu (Final)
  Lucas Corvée / Joris Grosjean (quarter-final)
  Ronald Alexander / Selvanus Geh (semi-final)
  Nelson Heg / Teo Ee Yi (champion)
  Lukhi Apri Nugroho / Kevin Sanjaya Sukamuljo (quarter-final)
  Sant Enos Jani / Low Juan Shen (third round)
  Russell Muns / Robin Tabeling (third round)
  Wannawat Ampunsuwan / Tinn Isriyanet (third round)

Finals

Section 1

Section 2

Section 3

Section 4

Girls Doubles

Seeded

  Suci Rizky Andini / Tiara Rosalia Nuraidah (semifinals)
  Chow Mei Kuan / Lee Meng Yean (third round)
  Sandra-Maria Jensen / Line Kjærsfeldt (second round)
  Lee So-hee / Shin Seung-chan (champions)
  Neslihan Kılıç / Neslihan Yiğit (second round)
  Shella Devi Aulia / Anggia Shitta Awanda (final)
  Soniia Cheah / Yang Li Lian (quarter-finals)
  Pacharakamol Arkornsakul / Chonthicha Kittiharakul (quarter-finals)

Finals

Section 1

Section 2

Section 3

Section 4

Medal table

See also
 List of sporting events in Taiwan

References

External links
World Juniors Team Championships 2011 at Tournamentsoftware.com
World Junior Championships 2011 at Tournamentsoftware.com

 
BWF World Junior Championships
World Junior Championships
BWF World Junior Championships
BWF World Junior Championships
2011 in Taiwanese sport
2011 in youth sport
Sport in Taoyuan City
Sport in Taipei